The New Year's Eve 1963 snowstorm was a significant winter storm occurring from December 31, 1963 to January 1, 1964 over most of the Southern United States. The storm began when a surface low-pressure system moved northward through the eastern Gulf of Mexico and up the Fall Line east of the Appalachians, leading to a snowstorm from the central Gulf coast northward into Tennessee. Three people perished during the storm, and travel was severely restricted for a couple of days following the snowfall. The strong winds accompanied by heavy snow fall set historic new snowfall records in Alabama.

Synoptic history

A shortwave in the southern stream of the Westerlies closed off as it approached the central United States Gulf of Mexico coastline. A surface cyclone formed in the Yucatán Peninsula of Mexico, slowly deepening as it moved north-northeast across the eastern Gulf. Cold air was residing across the Deep South in advance of this system, and as the surface cyclone tracked across northern Florida, heavy snowfall fell in its comma head from the Mouth of the Mississippi River northeast through Mississippi and Alabama into Tennessee, where the snow persisted into January 1. The cyclone ultimately moved along the east coast of the United States and Atlantic Canada, moving out into the far north Atlantic as a strengthening storm.

Effects

Damages totalled at least US$50,000 (1963 dollars). Tree branches and power lines were downed as over a foot of snow fell in a band across eastern Mississippi. Three people lost their lives in traffic accidents relating to the storm. Damage totalled at least US$50,000. Across Alabama, Huntsville recorded  of snow, setting a new record for daily, weekly, and monthly snowfall. It was the worst snow storm for the area since 1899. In Mississippi, Meridian saw  while Bay St. Louis saw a  snowfall. This became the snowiest day in Biloxi, Mississippi history. Mobile, Alabama measured  of snow. Many roads and highways were impassable for two to three days after the snow fell. Damage totaled at least US$550,000 (1963 dollars).

Power and telephone lines were downed. Several boats were sunk at their docks when a shed covering them collapsed under the weight of the snow. Damage totaled more than US$50,000. Farther north across Pennsylvania on January 1,  fell at Millersville.

See also
Surface weather analysis

References

1963 meteorology
1964 meteorology
Natural disasters in Alabama
Natural disasters in Louisiana
Natural disasters in Mississippi
Natural disasters in Pennsylvania
Natural disasters in Tennessee
1963 natural disasters in the United States